Bauchi State Television is a television broadcasting station owned by Bauchi State Government. It was established in 1998 with its corporate Head office located at Wuntin Dada, along Jos Road, Bauchi, Bauchi State, Nigeria. Babayo Rufai Muhammad is the current Director Programs at the Bauchi State Television (BATV).

See also
Nigerian Television Authority

References

External links

Television in Nigeria
Television channels and stations established in 1998
1976 establishments in Nigeria
Public broadcasting in Nigeria